Enzo Facciolo (2 October 1931 – 13 August 2021) was an Italian artist who was known for Diabolik comic work.

Early life and career
Facciolo was born on 2 October 1931, in Milan, Italy, and was educated at Scuola d'Arte al Castello Sforzesco.

In 1959, he wrote and drew his first comic strip.

In 1963, he started working on Diabolik.

On 13 August 2021, Facciolo died at the age of 89.

References

1931 births
2021 deaths
Italian designers
Artists from Milan